Kuriakose Elias College, Mannanam, famous as K.E. College is a general degree college located in Mannanam, Kottayam district, Kerala. It was established in the year 1964. The college is affiliated with Mahatma Gandhi University. This college offers different courses in arts, commerce and science in both graduation and post graduation streams.

Departments

Science

Physics
Chemistry
Mathematics
Botany
Zoology
Psychology
Statistics
Electronics
Computer Science

Arts and Commerce

Malayalam
English
History
Political Science
Economics
Social Work
Physical Education
Commerce

Accreditation
The college is  recognized by the University Grants Commission (UGC).

Notable alumni
C. V. Ananda Bose, Former Secretary to The Government of India & the Governor of West Bengal State of India
 P. K. Biju, Member of parliament
 Dileesh Pothan, Actor
Sabu Thomas, Vice-Chancellor of Mahatma Gandhi University, Kerala

References

External links

Universities and colleges in Kottayam district
Educational institutions established in 1964
1964 establishments in Kerala
Arts and Science colleges in Kerala
Colleges affiliated to Mahatma Gandhi University, Kerala